Roman Prymula (born 4 February 1964) is a Czech physician, professor of epidemiology, and a retired army colonel.

During the early stages of the COVID-19 pandemic in the Czech Republic, he served as the head of the Czech government's Central Crisis Board and then as a government agent for science and research. On 21 September 2020 he was named as Minister of Health of the Czech Republic by Prime Minister Andrej Babiš following the resignation of Adam Vojtěch.

On 21 October 2020, the tabloid Blesk published photographs of Prymula and Jaroslav Faltýnek leaving a restaurant late at night in apparent breach of COVID-19 regulations, under which all restaurants were supposed to be closed. He was replaced by Jan Blatný on 29 October.

References

Czech epidemiologists
Czech medical researchers
Czech chess players
COVID-19 pandemic in the Czech Republic
1964 births
Living people
Health ministers of the Czech Republic
ANO 2011 Government ministers
People from Pardubice
Czech hospital administrators
Recipients of the Order of the White Lion
Charles University alumni